John Byron, 1st Baron Byron KB (1599 – 23 August 1652) was an English nobleman, Royalist, politician, peer, knight, and supporter of Charles I during the English Civil War.

Life
Byron was the son of Sir John Byron of Newstead Abbey, Nottinghamshire, and Anne Molyneux. His grandfather, another Sir John Byron, had represented Nottinghamshire in Parliament. The future first baron was educated at Trinity College, Cambridge. He succeeded his father when the latter died on 28 September 1625.

He was elected as MP for Nottingham in 1624 and 1626. He was knighted (KB) in 1626 and was then elected as knight of the shire (MP) for Nottinghamshire in 1628. He also served as High Sheriff of Nottinghamshire for 1634 and then as Lieutenant of the Tower of London, from December 1641 to February 1642.

When the Civil War started, he joined the king at York. He was engaged in the Royalists' cause throughout the Civil Wars and afterwards. After Byron distinguished himself at the First Battle of Newbury King Charles created him Baron Byron in October 1643 and made him commander of the Royalist forces in Lancashire and Cheshire. However, he was defeated at the Battle of Nantwich in 1644 and forced to withdraw to Chester. He then marched with Prince Rupert's forces into Yorkshire and commanded the royalist right flank at the Battle of Marston Moor in July 1644, but after his troops were routed by numerically superior parliamentarian forces he retreated to Carnarvon and resigned his command. He did, however, defend Carnarvon Castle ably for the Royalist cause, withstanding long sieges before finally surrendering it to Parliamentary forces in 1646.

Lord Byron died in 1652, childless, in exile in Paris, and was succeeded by his next eldest brother Richard Byron, 2nd Baron Byron (born 1606).

Family
Lord Byron married firstly Cecilia West, daughter of Thomas West, 3rd Baron De La Warr and secondly Eleanor Needham (1627–1664) daughter of Robert Needham, 2nd Viscount Kilmorey. Eleanor was famous for her beauty; Peter Lely painted her as St. Catherine, as depicted here; and according to the diarist Samuel Pepys she was the 17th mistress of Charles II. One of Lord Byron's younger brothers was the Royalist soldier Sir Robert Byron.

Notes

References

External links

1599 births
1652 deaths
Alumni of Trinity College, Cambridge
16th-century English people
17th-century English nobility
People from Newstead, Nottinghamshire
Military personnel from Nottinghamshire
John
High Sheriffs of Nottinghamshire
English MPs 1624–1625
English MPs 1626
English MPs 1628–1629
Lieutenants of the Tower of London
Barons Byron
Royalist military personnel of the English Civil War